Valeri Aleksandrovich Popovitch (born 18 May 1970) is a Russian former football forward. Popovitch is the all-time scoring leader of FC Haka. After his contract ended with HJK in 2010, he joined Ilves Tampere playing in Kakkonen, as a player-coach, signing a two-year contract. Currently he is a youth coach at FC Haka.

He has also capped several times for Soviet U-17 and U-19 National football teams. U-17 finished third in the 1986 UEFA European Under-17 Football Championship, and U-19 won the UEFA European Under-19 Football Championship in 1988. Popovitch played in both tournaments.

Popovitch played for FC CSKA Moscow in Soviet First League and FC Spartak Moscow in the Soviet Top League.

Legacy
Popovitch holds a legendary status in Finland and especially in Valkeakoski, where his regarded as one of the best players ever to play for FC Haka. FC Haka retired his number, 14.

References

1970 births
Living people
Sportspeople from Nizhny Novgorod
Finnish footballers
Soviet footballers
Soviet Top League players
Veikkausliiga players
Eredivisie players
Danish Superliga players
PFC CSKA Moscow players
FC Spartak Moscow players
SC Heerenveen players
FC Haka players
Helsingin Jalkapalloklubi players
FC Lokomotiv Nizhny Novgorod players
Ikast FS players
Expatriate men's footballers in Denmark
Expatriate footballers in the Netherlands
Russian emigrants to Finland
FC Haka managers
Association football forwards
Association football midfielders
FC Khimik Dzerzhinsk players
Russian football managers
Russian expatriate sportspeople in Finland
Russian expatriate sportspeople in Denmark
Russian expatriate sportspeople in the Netherlands